Perkinsville can refer to:
 Perkinsville, Alaska, USA
 Perkinsville, Arizona, USA
the Perkinsville Bridge is nearby
 Perkinsville, County Durham, England
 Perkinsville, Indiana, USA
 Perkinsville, New York, USA
 Perkinsville, Vermont, USA